Volutaria is a genus of flowering plants in the family Asteraceae. They range from Iberia to the Near East and East Africa, but are most diverse in the Maghreb.

 Species

References

External links
 
 PPP-Index: Volutaria
 Euro+Med PlantBase: Volutaria

Asteraceae genera
Cynareae